An ell is a measure of length.

Ell or ELL may also refer to:

People 
 Ell (surname), a family name
 Eldar Gasimov (born 1989), Azerbaijani singer
 Ell Roberson (born 1980), American football player

Places 
 Ell, Luxembourg, a commune and town
 Ell, Netherlands, a town
 Ell Pond (disambiguation)

Other uses 
 Ell (architecture)
 ELL (gene), coding for the RNA polymerase II elongation factor ELL
 East London line, part of the London Overground
 Encyclopedia of Language and Linguistics, a compendium of human communication
 English-language learner
 European Lunar Lander
 Edges of the Last Layer, in speedcubing
 L, a letter
 Azimuthal quantum number
 Modern Greek language

See also
Aelle (disambiguation)
Elle (disambiguation)
Ells (disambiguation)